This is a '''list of firearm brands.

See also
 List of firearms
 List of modern armament manufacturers

References

Firearms manufacturers
firearm brands
 Brands